Jamie Gray (born 13 April 1998) is an Irish footballer who plays as a forward for  club Bromsgrove Sporting.

Playing career

Stevenage
Gray joined Stevenage as an academy scholar in the summer of 2015, having previously played for Irish academy team St Kevin's Boys. Ahead of the 2016–17 season, he signed a three-year professional contract with Stevenage after playing in a number of pre-season friendlies. Gray made his professional debut on 22 April 2017, coming on as a 66th-minute substitute in a 1–0 home defeat to Mansfield Town. He made two further appearances towards the latter stages of the same season, both of which were as a second-half substitute.

Having played nine times for Stevenage during the first half of the 2017–18 season, all of which as a substitute, Gray was loaned out to Southern Football League Premier Division club Royston Town on 20 February 2018. The length of the loan was undisclosed. He made his debut for Royston Town on the same day, playing the opening 60 minutes in a 1–0 away defeat to Kings Langley. He made one further appearance during the loan agreement before returning to Stevenage. Gray was released by Stevenage upon the expiry of his contract in May 2018.

Tolka Rovers
In the summer of 2019, Gray signed for Leinster Senior League club Tolka Rovers.

Bromsgrove Sporting
Gray signed for Southern League Premier Division Central club Bromsgrove Sporting on 3 July 2020.

Career Statistics

References

External links

1998 births
Living people
Republic of Ireland association footballers
Association football forwards
Stevenage F.C. players
Royston Town F.C. players
Tolka Rovers F.C. players
Bromsgrove Sporting F.C. players
English Football League players